Frederick York (1823–1903) was an early photographer who established the business York & Son in Notting Hill, specialising in the manufacture of lantern slides.

References

1823 births
1903 deaths
Photographers from London
19th-century English photographers